"I Think About Lovin' You" is a song by the band Earth, Wind & Fire released as a single in January 1972 by Warner Bros. Records. The song peaked at No. 44 on the Billboard Hot Soul Singles chart.

Overview
"I Think About Lovin' You" was produced by Joe Wissert and composed by Sherry Scott. The song came off EWF's 1971 studio album The Need of Love.

Critical reception
Billboard described I Think About Lovin' You as "a soulful blues ballad".

Samples
The song was sampled by the Fugees on the track "Nappy Heads", which was featured on their 1994 album Blunted on Reality.

References

Earth, Wind & Fire songs
1972 singles
Warner Records singles